Fernando Medina (born 3 April 1973) is a Spanish fencer. He competed in the sabre events at the 1996, 2000 and 2004 Summer Olympics. He won a bronze medal at the 1998 World Fencing Championships.

References

External links
 

1973 births
Living people
Spanish male sabre fencers
Olympic fencers of Spain
Fencers at the 1996 Summer Olympics
Fencers at the 2000 Summer Olympics
Fencers at the 2004 Summer Olympics
Sportspeople from Seville